Cleopatra Jones and the Casino of Gold is a 1975 American action-adventure film directed by Charles Bail and starring Tamara Dobson as Cleopatra "Cleo" Jones, Stella Stevens and Norman Fell. The film is a sequel to the 1973 action film  Cleopatra Jones.

Plot

The story begins with two government agents, Matthew Johnson and Melvin Johnson, being captured by the "Dragon Lady" (Stella Stevens). Cleopatra Jones then travels to Hong Kong to rescue the agents. Jones pairs up with Mi Lin-fong and ends up in the Dragon Lady's casino, which, in actuality, is the headquarters for her underground drug empire. Jones and Mi use their combat skills to battle the Dragon Lady's henchmen and rescues the agents.

Cast
 Tamara Dobson as Cleopatra Jones
 Ni Tien as Mi Lin-fong
 Stella Stevens as Dragon Lady
 Norman Fell as Stanley Nagel
 Albert Popwell as Matthew Johnson
 Caro Kenyatta as Melvin Johnson

Max Julien, author of the source story for, and a co-producer of, the film's predecessor, Cleopatra Jones, refused to participate in the production, and instead got token credit for the story and script having been "based on characters created by" him.

Reception
The film was not as well received as its predecessor, Cleopatra Jones, due mainly to the decline in the popularity of the blaxploitation genre.

The film was released on DVD by Warner Brothers  as part of its Warner Archive Collection in 2010.

See also
 List of action films of the 1970s
 List of films set in Hong Kong
 List of American films of 1975

References

External links
 
 
 
 

1975 films
1970s crime films
1975 LGBT-related films
Blaxploitation films
American crime films
African-American LGBT-related films
American sequel films
Films set in Hong Kong
Films scored by Dominic Frontiere
Films set in Los Angeles
Films shot in Hong Kong
Warner Bros. films
1970s English-language films
Films directed by Charles Bail
1970s American films